Breznica is a small village and municipality in Varaždin County in Croatia. According to the 2011 census, there are 2,200 inhabitants, the absolute majority of which are Croats.

References

External links
 

Municipalities of Croatia
Populated places in Varaždin County